Arroyo Club Polideportivo is a Spanish football club  based in Arroyo de la Luz, in the autonomous community of Extremadura. Founded in 1968 it plays in Tercera División – Group 14, holding home games at Estadio Municipal, with a 3,000-seat capacity.

History 
In the 2018-19 season the club was about to being relegated from the Tercera División, Group 14 by finishing just 5 points away from the relegation zone.

Season to season

3 seasons in Segunda División B
12 seasons in Tercera División

Current squad

References

External links
Official website 
Futbolme team profile 

 
Football clubs in Extremadura
Association football clubs established in 1968
1968 establishments in Spain
Province of Cáceres